Nate Gatzert (1890–1959) was an American screenwriter. He worked on the screenplays of a number of westerns for Columbia Pictures and Universal Pictures during the 1930s.

Selected filmography

 The Royal Rider (1929)
 Strawberry Roan (1933)
 The Fiddlin' Buckaroo (1933)
 The Trail Drive (1933)
 Honor of the Range (1934)
 Smoking Guns (1934)
 Wheels of Destiny (1934)
 Rustlers of Red Dog (1935)
 Heir to Trouble (1935)
 The Roaring West (1935)
 Western Frontier (1935)
 Lawless Riders (1935)
 Western Courage (1935)
 Rio Grande Ranger (1936)
 The Cattle Thief (1936)
 Avenging Waters (1936)
 Heroes of the Range (1936)
 The Unknown Ranger (1936)
 The Fugitive Sheriff (1936)
 The Rangers Step In (1937)
 Reckless Ranger (1937)
 Law of the Ranger (1937)
 Ranger Courage (1937)
 Pioneer Trail (1938)
 Stagecoach Days (1938)
 In Early Arizona (1938)
 Rolling Caravans (1938)
 Phantom Gold (1938)
 Frontiers of '49 (1939)
 Lone Star Pioneers (1939)
 The Law Comes to Texas (1939)

References

Bibliography
 Scott Allen Nollen. Three Bad Men: John Ford, John Wayne, Ward Bond. McFarland, 2013.

External links

1890 births
1959 deaths
American screenwriters
People from Chicago
20th-century American screenwriters